Afmite (IMA symbol: Afm) is phosphate mineral with the chemical formula Al(OH)(PO)(POOH)·HO. It is named for the French mineralogy group Association Française de Microminéralogie, or AFM for short.

References

External links 

 Afmite on the Handbook of Mineralogy

Phosphate minerals